Darragh Hickey (born 1986) is an Irish hurler who plays at club level with Boherlahan–Dualla. He is a former member of the Tipperary senior hurling team.

Playing career

Hickey first played hurling at juvenile and underage levels with the Boherlahan–Dualla club, before joining the club's top adult team. He first appeared on the inter-county scene at minor level with Tipperary and won a Munster Championship in 2003 as well as being the championship's top scorer the following year. Hickey later lined out  in the 2006 All-Ireland under-21 final defeat by Kilkenny. He was drafted onto the Tipperary senior hurling team in 2007 and won National Hurling League and Munster Championship titles in 2008.

Career statistics

Honours

Tipperary
Munster Senior Hurling Championship: 2008
National Hurling League: 2008
Munster Under-21 Hurling Championship: 2006
Munster Minor Hurling Championship: 2003

References

1986 births
Living people
Boherlahan-Dualla hurlers
Tipperary inter-county hurlers